The 2014−15 season was Shrewsbury's first season back in League Two after being relegated in the 2013−14 season. They won promotion back to League One at the first attempt, following a 1–0 win away at Cheltenham Town on 25 April 2015.

They also participated in the League Cup, the Football League Trophy and the FA Cup.

A side consisting of youth and reserve team players also contested, and subsequently won the Shropshire Senior Cup.

Players

First team squad information
As of match played 2 May 2015

Transfers

In

Out

Loans In

Loans Out

Competitions

League Two

Match details

Pre-season friendlies

League Two

The fixtures for the 2014–15 season were announced on 18 June 2014 at 9am.

FA Cup

The draw for the first round was made on 27 October 2014 at 1900. Shrewsbury were drawn away at Walsall.

League Cup

The draw for the first round was made on 17 June 2014 and Shrewsbury were drawn at home against Blackpool. For the second round the draw was made on 13 August 2014 and this time Shrewsbury were drawn away at Leicester City. The draw for the third round was made on 27 August 2014 when Shrewsbury were drawn at home to Norwich City. On 24 September 2014, the draw for the fourth round was made and Shrewsbury were drawn at home to Premier League club Chelsea.

Football League Trophy

The draw for the first round was made on 16 August 2014.

Shropshire Senior Cup

Shrewsbury Town received a bye to the semi-final stage.

Player statistics

Squad stats

As of match played 2 May 2015

|-
|-
|colspan="14"|Players away from the club on loan:
|-

|-
|colspan="14"|Players who left the club before the end of the season:

|}

Top scorers

Disciplinary record

References

Shrewsbury Town F.C. seasons
Shrewsbury Town F.C.